Prince Bi Gan (Bǐgān) was a prominent Chinese figure during the Shang dynasty. He was a son of King Wen Ding, and an uncle of King Zhou, and served as the Prime Minister of the Kingdom of Shang. He was later worshipped as the God of Wealth.

History

Prince Bigan was the prime minister of the Kingdom of Shang during the late Shang dynasty, and a member of the Shang royal family. His ancestral name was "Zi" (子). He was the son of King Wen Ding and served his nephew, King Zhou. Zhou, the last king of the Shang dynasty, has been traditionally regarded as notoriously cruel, immoral, and wasteful. According to the account recorded by Sima Qian in his Records of the Grand Historian, King Zhou's minister Prince Weizi admonished him to reform his ways several times, but his admonitions fell on deaf ears. Prince Weizi then decided to withdraw from the court, but Prince Bigan argued that to serve as minister meant doing what was right even if it meant death. Prince Bigan continued to strongly criticise his ruler's conduct, and an enraged King Zhou ordered his execution, proclaiming that he wanted to see if it was true that a sage's heart had seven apertures.

David Schaberg has argued that the tendency for later politicians to adopt an indirect style of critique when disagreeing with their rulers was influenced by the gruesome fate of figures like Prince Bigan.

Reputation

In the Analects, Prince Bigan was honored by Confucius as one of "the three sages" of the Shang dynasty, together with Prince Weizi and Prince Jizi. Prince Bigan later became an exemplar of the loyal advisor willing to lose his life for giving truthful advice. When the Spring and Autumn-era general and politician of Wu, Wu Zixu, was ordered to commit suicide, his last words were, "After my death, later generations will definitely think that I was loyal. They will indeed match me up to the Xia and Yin [i.e., Shang] eras, making me a companion of Longfeng and Bigan”. When Hu Yuan, who served King Min of Qi, was about to be executed, he referenced both Prince Bigan and Wu Zixu: "Yin had its Bigan, Wu had its Zixu, and Qi [now] has its Hu Yuan. [This state] not only didn't make use of apt words, it also executed their speaker at its eastern gate. By being executed, I will form a triad with those two masters." The historian  ranked Prince Bigan alongside Guan Longfeng, Qu Yuan, Zhuge Liang, and Wei Zheng as one of the great frank and courageous patriots of Chinese history.

God of Wealth

Later accounts of the life of Prince Bigan added details, including that his execution came at request of King Zhou's notorious concubine Daji, because she objected that Prince Bigan had remonstrated with King Zhou for wasting money meant for the common good. These depictions were an influence on Prince Bigan's later deification as a Caishen, or God of Wealth. A notable example of this version of Prince Bigan's story can be seen in the famous Ming dynasty novel The Investiture of the Gods.

Notes

References

Deities in Taoism
Chinese gods
Deified Chinese people
11th-century BC Chinese people
Shang dynasty politicians
Investiture of the Gods characters